Hilgert in the Kannenbäckerland is an Ortsgemeinde – a community belonging to a Verbandsgemeinde – in the Westerwaldkreis in Rhineland-Palatinate, Germany.

Geography

Hilgert lies roughly 13 km from Koblenz on the edge of the Nassau Nature Park. The community belongs to the Verbandsgemeinde of Höhr-Grenzhausen, a kind of collective municipality.

History
Hilgert was first mentioned in documents dating to 1340.

Politics

The municipal council is made up of 17 council members, including the extraofficial mayor (Bürgermeister), who were elected in a municipal election on 7 June 2009.

Economy and infrastructure

Transport
The A 48 with its Höhr-Grenzhausen interchange (AS 12) lies right near the municipal area, 3 km away. There is no rail connection, only an hourly bus to Koblenz.

References

Municipalities in Rhineland-Palatinate
Westerwaldkreis